Bowieite is a rhodium-iridium-platinum sulfide mineral , found in platinum-alloy nuggets from Goodnews Bay, Alaska. It was named (by the IMA in 1984) after the British scientist Stanley Bowie (1917–2008), in recognition of his work on identification of opaque minerals.

The mineral crystallizes in the orthorhombic crystal system (space group Pbcn).

References

New mineral 1984

Iridium minerals
Platinum minerals
Rhodium minerals
Sulfide minerals
Orthorhombic minerals
Minerals in space group 60
Minerals described in 1984